General Sir Cecil Stanway Sugden  (4 December 1903 – 25 March 1963) was a senior British Army officer who became Master-General of the Ordnance.

Military career
Educated at Brighton College, Sugden was commissioned as a second lieutenant into the Royal Engineers on 29 August 1923. He attended the Staff College, Quetta from 1932 to 1933.

He served in World War II in North Africa and then was Director of Plans at the War Office from 1943.

After the War he became Director of Military Operations at the War Office in 1945. He became a Brigadier on the General Staff at Headquarters British Troops in Egypt in 1947, the same year he served as an instructor at the Imperial Defence College, and then Chief of Staff there in 1948.

He returned to the War Office as Director of Personnel Administration in 1949 and then became Chief of Staff for British Army of the Rhine in 1951. He was appointed Commander of British Forces in Hong Kong in 1954 and Commander-in-Chief of Allied Forces Northern Europe in 1956. He served as Quartermaster-General to the Forces from 1958 to 1961 when he became Master-General of the Ordnance.

References

Bibliography

External links
Generals of World War II

|-

|-
 

|-
 

1903 births
1963 deaths
British Army generals
British Army generals of World War II
Graduates of the Royal Military Academy, Woolwich
Graduates of the Staff College, Quetta
Knights Commander of the Order of the Bath
Knights Grand Cross of the Order of the British Empire
People educated at Brighton College
People from Rawalpindi
Royal Engineers officers
War Office personnel in World War II
Military personnel of British India
British people in colonial India